The Social Democratic Party, officially the People's Party, was a social-democratic political party in Iceland.

It was founded in 1916, as the political representation of the trade unions of Iceland.

History 
In 1920 its first member of the Althing, the Icelandic parliament, Jón Baldvinsson was elected.

The party would contest elections to the Althing with little success until 1934, when the party obtained 10 parliamentary seats. Iceland shifted towards a proportional representation system later that year which political scientist Amel Ahmed attributes to the rising electoral threat that the Social Democratic Party posed to the Independence Party and Progressive Party.

Between 1926 and 1940, the party was a member of the Labour and Socialist International.

The party led the government of Iceland three times, first in 1947–1949 under Stefán Jóhann Stefánsson, then in 1958–1959 under Emil Jónsson and finally under Benedikt Sigurðsson Gröndal in 1979–1980.

Its longest participation in government was with the Independence Party from 1959–1971.

The Social Democratic Party was succeeded in 2000 by the Social Democratic Alliance, a centre-left party with a wider political base created by the merger of the Social Democratic Party with the National Awakening, the People's Alliance and the Women's List.

Party chairmen 
 Ottó N. Þorláksson (1916)
 Jón Baldvinsson (1916–1938)
 Stefán Jóhann Stefánsson (1938–1952)
 Hannibal Valdimarsson (1952–1954)
 Haraldur Guðmundsson (1954–1958)
 Emil Jónsson (1958–1968)
 Gylfi Þorsteinsson Gíslason (1968–1974)
 Benedikt Sigurðsson Gröndal (1974–1980)
 Kjartan Jóhannsson (1980–1984)
 Jón Baldvin Hannibalsson (1984–1996)
 Sighvatur Kristinn Björgvinsson (1996–1998)
 Guðmundur Árni Stefánsson (1998–2000)

Election results

References

Further reading 
 Busky, Donald F. (2000). Democratic Socialism: A Global Survey. Greenwood Publishing Group. pp. 71–72. .

1916 establishments in Iceland
2000 disestablishments in Iceland
Defunct political parties in Iceland
Members of the Labour and Socialist International
Political parties established in 1916
Political parties disestablished in 2000
Social democratic parties
Social Democratic Alliance